Paul Cérésole (16 November 1832, in Friedrichsdorf, Hesse-Homburg – 7 January 1905) was a Swiss politician, judge of the Supreme Court (1867–1870) and member of the Swiss Federal Council (1870–1875).

He was elected to the Federal Council of Switzerland on 1 February 1870, and handed over office on 31 December 1875. He was affiliated with the Free Democratic Party of Switzerland. 

While in office he held the following departments:
Department of Finance (1870–1871)
Military Department (1872)
Political Department as President of the Confederation (1873)
Department of Justice and Police (1874–1875)

His son Pierre was a noted pacifist.

Cérésole died 1905 in Lausanne.

"Avenue Paul-Cérésole" in Vevey is named for him.

References

External links

1832 births
1905 deaths
People from Friedrichsdorf
Swiss Calvinist and Reformed Christians
Swiss people of Italian descent
Free Democratic Party of Switzerland politicians
Foreign ministers of Switzerland
Finance ministers of Switzerland
Members of the Federal Council (Switzerland)
Members of the National Council (Switzerland)
Federal Supreme Court of Switzerland judges
University of Lausanne alumni
19th-century Swiss judges
19th-century Swiss politicians